Marika Anthony-Shaw is a Canadian violist/violinist who was a touring member of the band Arcade Fire and played viola on their albums Neon Bible and The Suburbs.

Prior to her current role, she was an Orchestra (Strings) teacher at Lindsay Place High School located on the West Island of Montreal. She has also played viola on the albums Set Yourself on Fire by Stars and Recording a Tape the Colour of the Light by Bell Orchestre.

Silver Starling

She was also a member of the Montreal group Silver Starling, who released their self-titled debut in 2009 on Last Gang Records. She played keyboard and sings backing vocals for the band.

References

Living people
Year of birth missing (living people)
Arcade Fire members
Canadian rock violinists
Canadian violists
21st-century Canadian violinists and fiddlers
Canadian women violinists and fiddlers